Prescott is a city in Linn County, Kansas, United States.  As of the 2020 census, the population of the city was 207.

History
Prescott was laid out in 1870. It was named for C.H. Prescott, a railroad official.

Geography
Prescott is located at  (38.063063, -94.696339).

Demographics

2010 census
As of the census of 2010, there were 264 people, 109 households, and 64 families residing in the city. The racial makeup of the city was 92.4% White, 0.8% African American, 2.3% Native American, 2.7% from other races, and 1.9% from two or more races. Hispanic or Latino of any race were 3.4% of the population.

There were 109 households, of which 19.3% had children under the age of 18 living with them, 47.7% were married couples living together, 5.5% had a female householder with no husband present, 5.5% had a male householder with no wife present, and 41.3% were non-families. 36.7% of all households were made up of individuals, and 15.6% had someone living alone who was 65 years of age or older. The average household size was 2.10 and the average family size was 2.66.

The median age in the city was 49.8 years. 17% of residents were under the age of 18; 5% were between the ages of 18 and 24; 20.1% were from 25 to 44; 28.3% were from 45 to 64; and 29.5% were 65 years of age or older. The gender makeup of the city was 49.2% male and 50.8% female.

2000 census
As of the census of 2000, there were 280 people, 109 households, and 58 families residing in the city. The racial makeup of the city was 99.29% White, 0.36% Native American and 0.36% Asian. Hispanic or Latino of any race were 2.14% of the population.

There were 109 households, out of which 22.0% had children under the age of 18 living with them, 41.3% were married couples living together, 11.0% had a female householder with no husband present, and 45.9% were non-families. 43.1% of all households were made up of individuals, and 25.7% had someone living alone who was 65 years of age or older. The average household size was 2.03 and the average family size was 2.78.

In the city, the population was spread out, with 16.8% under the age of 18, 5.4% from 18 to 24, 17.9% from 25 to 44, 18.2% from 45 to 64, and 41.8% who were 65 years of age or older. The median age was 53 years. For every 100 females, there were 77.2 males. For every 100 females age 18 and over, there were 72.6 males.

The median income for a household in the city was $23,462, and the median income for a family was $33,125. Males had a median income of $20,694 versus $31,875 for females. The per capita income for the city was $12,811. About 3.7% of families and 15.6% of the population were below the poverty line, including 11.8% of those under the age of eighteen and 16.9% of those 65 or over.

Education
Prescott is served by Jayhawk USD 346. The district high school is Jayhawk-Linn High School.

Prescott High School was closed through school unification. The Prescott High School mascot was Hornets.

References

Further reading

External links
 City of Prescott
 Prescott - Directory of Public Officials
 Prescott city map, KDOT

Cities in Kansas
Cities in Linn County, Kansas
1870 establishments in Kansas